We Didn't Start the Fire is a modern history podcast started in 2021. It is hosted by Katie Puckrik and Tom Fordyce and produced by Crowd Network.

Premise
The podcasts takes topics from the pop song "We Didn't Start the Fire", released by Billy Joel in 1989. The song lists, via a series of fast-paced lyrics, brief references to 118 significant political, cultural, scientific, and sporting events between 1949, the year of Joel's birth, and 1989, in a mainly chronological order. The podcast looks at these in turn with expert guests, with topics including the politics of Harry S. Truman, space exploration, rock'n'roll and also including American, Korean and Cuba-Soviet Union relations at the height of The Cold War.

Reception 
Miranda Sawyer in The Guardian reviewed a "funny, informative discussion.. genuinely interesting and fun" and described it as her "new favourite show". Sawyer later noted that "Puckrik and Fordyce are funny, but also excellent interviewers and this show, which incorporates war, philosophy, celebrity and political machinations, is far better than you would ever imagine." Sawyer later put the podcast in her top 10 of the year for 2021.

Billy Joel himself heard the show and appears as a special guest on an episode first broadcast on October 25, 2021.

Episodes

References

History podcasts
Audio podcasts
2021 podcast debuts